John Cooke Simerson, Jr. (April 20, 1935 – August 2, 1992) was an American football center who played two seasons in the National Football League with the Philadelphia Eagles and Pittsburgh Steelers. He was drafted by the Philadelphia Eagles in the 22nd round of the 1957 NFL Draft. He played college football at Purdue University and attended President Theodore Roosevelt High School in Honolulu, Hawaii. Simerson was also a member of the Houston Oilers and Boston Patriots of the American Football League.

References

External links
Just Sports Stats

1935 births
1992 deaths
Players of American football from Honolulu
American football centers
Purdue Boilermakers football players
Philadelphia Eagles players
Pittsburgh Steelers players
Houston Oilers players
Boston Patriots players
Sportspeople from Honolulu
President Theodore Roosevelt High School alumni
American Football League players